Vacarisses is a village in the province of Barcelona and autonomous community of Catalonia, Spain. The village is home to korfball team CK Vacarisses.

References

External links
 Government data pages 

Municipalities in Vallès Occidental